The Briegleb BG-7 is an American strut-braced high-wing, single seat glider that was designed by William G. Briegleb and produced by the Sailplane Corporation of America as a completed aircraft and also as a kit.

Design and development
The BG-7 was a development of the 1939 BG-6, with longer, semi-tapered wings of  span, compared to the  wing on the earlier model.

The BG-7 wing is made from wood structure, with two spars and covered in doped aircraft fabric. The wing is supported by dual struts. The fuselage is made from steel tube, again with fabric covering and the tail is metal and fabric. The longer wing created stability issues and many aircraft were subsequently modified by either lengthening the tail to increase the tail arm or enlarging the vertical fin. Cockpit modifications were also common.

Three BG-7s were completed by the factory and a further 20 kits were sold. The type was never certified and most were amateur-built from factory kits.

Operational history
The record stood for eighteen years.

In March 2011 there were still 2 BG-7s on the Federal Aviation Administration register.

Specifications (BG-7)

See also
Briegleb El Mirage Airfield

References

1940s United States sailplanes
BG-7
Aircraft first flown in 1940